Moolia is a village of Abbottabad District in Khyber Pakhtunkhwa province of Pakistan. It is part of Bakot Union Council and is located in the east of the district. It was impacted by the 2005 earthquake.

It is one of the biggest villages of the UC Bakote. Previously it was UC but in recent time it is part of the UC Bakot and one of the biggest village of not only this UC but also considered in the list of the few biggest villages of PF 45. It has many hamlets, including Ghorwara, Havali, Jhanglie Gali, Laree, Batangi Kehter, Vphatto na bagla.(پھت و نا بگلا ) Kehter, Nighrori, upper pand, Chatibat, Kiasbagla, Nala, Nithial, Arra, Dandian, Kah-na-Kehter, Ghandan, Bagh, Topa, and Kohi.

The village has one government high school, and one primary school for boys and one for girls. Although it has many government masjad primary schools. Government High School Moolia is one of the schools of the area. The literacy rate of the village is very high especially in females; we can say 90% of young girls are educated. Beside the government schools, there are also private schools system known as SASA, tehzeeb and Rasheed Ahmed Education system. Major Political parties here include PMN, PPPP, and Jamat-e-Islami.

References

Populated places in Abbottabad District